Natacha Amal (born 4 September 1968) is a Belgian actress.

Personal life
Amal was born on 4 September 1968  to a Moroccan father and a Russian mother in Brussels, Belgium.  She was married to Claude Rappe in 1997, but the couple divorced in 2007. In 2015, she got married with Jacques Stival.  In 2019, Gala magazine reported that Amal and Stival were divorcing.

Theater

Filmography

References

External links
 Interview Natacha Amal
 Interview with Natacha Amal at Eurochannel
 

1968 births
Belgian film actresses
Living people
Belgian people of Russian descent
Belgian television actresses
20th-century Belgian actresses
21st-century Belgian actresses
Belgian people of Moroccan descent